Música Popular Caiçara (Portuguese for "Caiçara Popular Music") is the second live album by Brazilian alternative rock band Charlie Brown Jr., released in CD, DVD and Blu-ray formats through Radar Records. Recorded during two gigs in 2011, one in Curitiba and the other in Santos, it was the band's first release since 2004's Tamo Aí na Atividade with original members Marcão and Champignon. Produced by Liminha and directed by KondZilla, the DVD and Blu-ray versions came out first, in 2012; the CD version was split in two volumes, the first of which was released concomitantly with the DVD and Blu-ray versions. The second volume was only released four years later, in 2016.

Initially, the album was recorded at Citibank Hall in São Paulo on March 19, 2011, still as a quartet and with bassist Heitor Gomes. However, due to the return of Marcão and Champignon in the middle of that year, the album's release was cancelled and they broke up with Sony Music, going on independently. However, the same show would be released 10 years later, with the title Chegou Quem Faltava.

Another curiosity is that the band recorded eight more tracks that unfortunately ended up being left out of the CD, DVD and Blu-ray; they are "Só por uma Noite", "Zóio de Lula", "Sino Dourado", "Gimme o Anel", "Sheik", "O Preço" and two new tracks, "De Olhos Abertos" and the title track "Música Popular Caiçara", a tribute to Santos FC.

The studio version of Céu Azul, which appears in Volume 1 as a bonus track, was included in the soundtracks of the telenovelas Balacobaco and Império. According to vocalist Chorão, he wrote it following his divorce from long-time wife and companion Graziela "Grazon" Gonçalves.

Critical reception
Anderson Nascimento of Galeria Musical gave the album a rating of 4 out of 5 stars. Mauro Ferreira of blog Notas Musicais also gave it the same rating, calling it a release "filled with energy and authenticity".

Track listing

Volume 1 (2012)

Volume 2 (2016)

Personnel

Charlie Brown Jr.
 Chorão: vocals
 Champignon: bass guitar, beatboxing, backing vocals
 Marcão Britto: electric guitar
 Thiago Castanho: electric guitar
 Bruno Graveto: drums

References

2012 video albums
Live video albums
2012 live albums
Charlie Brown Jr. albums
Albums produced by Liminha
Portuguese-language live albums